St. Theodore's Church is an Orthodox church in Berat Castle, Berat, Albania. It became a Cultural Monument of Albania in 1948.

References

Cultural Monuments of Albania
Churches in Berat
Tourist attractions in Berat